Grant Murray Snow (born October 20, 1959) is an American lawyer and jurist who serves as Chief U.S. district judge of the United States District Court for the District of Arizona. Snow was previously a state court judge on the Arizona Court of Appeals from 2002 to 2008.

Early life and education
Snow was born in Boulder City, Nevada. He received a Bachelor of Arts degree from Brigham Young University in 1984. He received a Juris Doctor from the J. Reuben Clark Law School at Brigham Young University in 1987.

Legal career
Snow started his legal career as a law clerk for Judge Stephen H. Anderson of the United States Court of Appeals for the Tenth Circuit from 1987 to 1988. He was in private practice in Phoenix, Arizona, from 1988 to 2002. He was a judge on the Arizona Court of Appeals from 2002 to 2008.

Federal judicial career
Snow was nominated by President George W. Bush on December 11, 2007, to a seat vacated by Stephen M. McNamee. He was confirmed by the United States Senate on June 26, 2008, and received his commission on July 23, 2008. He became Chief Judge on September 4, 2018.

Notable cases
On May 24, 2013, Snow ruled that the Maricopa County Sheriff's Office (MCSO), and Maricopa County Sheriff Joe Arpaio violated the Civil Rights Act of 1964, and committed acts of racial profiling against Hispanics.  The judge will also preside over the United States Department of Justice's lawsuit to gain access to MCSO’s documents and facilities, as part of the department’s investigation of alleged discrimination in MCSO’s police practices and jail operations. On January 15, 2015, he announced that he would be bringing civil contempt charges against the MCSO, with a hearing to be held in April, and on August 19, 2016, as one result of those proceedings, he issued an order requesting that the United States Attorney for the Arizona district  prosecute Arpaio and three of his MCSO associates for criminal contempt.

References

Sources

1959 births
Living people
Brigham Young University alumni
J. Reuben Clark Law School alumni
Judges of the United States District Court for the District of Arizona
People from Boulder City, Nevada
United States district court judges appointed by George W. Bush
21st-century American judges
Politicians from Tempe, Arizona